Wheatstone LNG is a liquefied natural gas plant operating in the Ashburton North Strategic Industrial Area, which is located  west of Onslow, Western Australia.  The project is operated by Chevron Australia Pty. Ltd.

History
The Wheatstone gas field was discovered in the Greater Gorgon Area in 2004. The final investment decision was made in September 2011, and construction began in December 2011.

Technical description
The project is expected to cost A$29 billion (US$29.7 billion).  The LNG liquefaction and export plant will have an annual capacity of 15 million tonnes of LNG.  In the first stage, the plant will have a gas plant, and two LNG trains with a capacity of 4.3 million tonnes per year each.  It will be supplied from the Wheatstone, Iago, Julimar and Brunello offshore gas fields.

Contractors
Front-end engineering and design works of the project are being performed by three companies. Bechtel Oil & Gas Chemicals Inc. is undertaking the design of the onshore gas plant. Intecsea Pty. Ltd., a subsidiary of The WorleyParsons Group, is designing the subsea infrastructure and trunkline. And Technip Pty. Ltd. is designing the offshore processing platform.  Geotechnical consultation for the design and construction of the LNG plant and associated infrastructure will be provided by Golder Associates.  Liquefied natural gas storage and condensate tanks to be built by a joint venture between Thiess and EV LNG Australia, a subsidiary of ENTREPOSE Contracting (itself a subsidiary of VINCI) and Vinci Construction Grands Projets.

Ready-for-startup operations support services will be provided by ODL, a subsidiary of Wood Group.  The operability, reliability and maintainability contract was awarded to Clough AMEC.

Developer
Chevron Australia Pty. Ltd. owns 72 percent of the project.  Royal Dutch Shell owns 6.4 percent of the project; Woodside owns 13 percent, KUFPEC Australia (Julimar) Pty. Ltd., a subsidiary of the Kuwait Foreign Petroleum Exploration Co., owns 7 percent; and Kyushu Electric Power Co. owns 1.6 percent of the project.

Exports
3.1 million tonnes of LNG per year will be exported to Tokyo Electric. Korea Gas Corp. (KOGAS) will buy 1.5 million tonnes per year.  Tohoku Electric and Chubu Electric will each buy 1 million tons per year. 300,000 tonnes per year will be exported to Kyushu Electric.

See also
Browse LNG
Gladstone LNG

References

Natural gas in Western Australia
Liquefied natural gas plants